A hoedown is a type of American folk dance or square dance in duple meter, and also the musical form associated with it.

Overview
The most popular sense of the term is associated with Americans in rural or southeastern parts of the country, particularly Appalachia. It is a dance in quick movement most likely related to the jig, reel or clog dance. In contest fiddling, a hoedown is a tune in fast 2/4 time. In many contests, fiddlers are required to play a waltz, a hoedown, and a "tune of choice," which must not be a waltz or a hoedown (typically it is a jig or a schottische).

In modern western square dance, a hoedown is a piece of music used for a patter call (a call that is spoken or chanted, rather than sung to the tune of a popular song), or the recording that contains this piece of music. In the early days of the Western square dance revival (the 1940s and early 1950s), most hoedowns were traditional fiddle tunes; since the late 1950s, recordings of simple chord progressions, with no discernible melody, have also been sold to callers under the name "hoedown." In the 1940s and early 1950s, the term "hoedown" was sometimes used to mean a call made up of parts of other calls. "Hoedown" was, and occasionally still is, also used to mean a dance party jointly sponsored by several dance clubs or by a federation of clubs.

References in modern culture
The most famous hoedown in classical music is the section entitled "Hoe-Down" from the Rodeo ballet by Aaron Copland (1942).  The most frequently heard version is from the Four Dance Episodes from Rodeo, which Copland extracted from the ballet shortly after its premiere; the dance episodes were first performed in 1943 by the Boston Pops conducted by Arthur Fiedler. Copland's "Hoe-Down" became even more famous through television advertisements by America's Beef Producers with the slogan "Beef. It's What's For Dinner". 

"Hoe-Down" has been covered by Emerson, Lake & Palmer on their album Trilogy, by Béla Fleck and the Flecktones on their albums Outbound and Live at the Quick, and by Jordan Rudess on his album Prime Cuts.  Additionally, the jazz musician Oliver Nelson performed a jazz-infused variation written by himself entitled "Hoe-Down" on his album The Blues and the Abstract Truth.

The Beatle's song Rocky Raccoon recounts a gunfight in a saloon, and uses "hoe-down" as a euphemism for sexual intercourse.

Each episode of the improvisational comedy show Whose Line Is It Anyway? typically ended in an impromptu hoedown singing competition.

See also
 Cèilidh
 Hootenanny

References

Further reading
 "Hoedown", "Aaron Copland", in Grove Music Online ed. L. Macy (Accessed August 7, 2005), (subscription access)

External links
Hoedown at Dance History Archives

Square dance
Social events